James Tufts (September 19, 1829–August 18, 1884) was a United States politician and acting governor of Montana Territory in 1869.

Biography
Born in Charlestown, New Hampshire, Tufts graduated from Middlebury College in 1855. He was admitted to the bar in 1857 and was an attorney in Iowa.

Career

Tufts moved to Niobrara in the Nebraska Territory in 1859, where he became a probate judge and served in the territorial legislature. Tufts moved to the Dakota Territory in 1861 and served as secretary for the legislative council of the Dakota Territory. He was appointed US Commissioner to adjust military claims in the Dakota Territory in 1862.

Tufts moved to Idaho Territory in 1863 and served in the Idaho Territorial Legislature. He was the first Speaker of the Idaho Territorial House of Representatives.

He was appointed territorial secretary for the Montana Territory in 1867, and served as its acting governor from March 1869 to April 9,1869.

Tufts ran for the Montana territorial delegate to the United States House of Representatives and lost the election. He moved back to Niobrara, Nebraska, to farm and practice law.

Death
Tufts died in Niobrara. He is buried in L'Eau Qui Court Cemetery.

References

External links
 

People from Charlestown, New Hampshire
People from Knox County, Nebraska
Middlebury College alumni
Members of the Nebraska Territorial Legislature
Governors of Montana Territory
Members of the Idaho Territorial Legislature
Dakota Territory officials
Iowa lawyers
Nebraska lawyers
1829 births
1884 deaths
Montana pioneers
Montana Republicans
Nebraska Republicans
Idaho Republicans
19th-century American politicians
19th-century American lawyers